Esabelle Dingizian (16 September 1962) is a Swedish Green Party politician. She has been a member of the Riksdag since 2006. She served as Third Deputy Speaker of the Riksdag from 2014 to 2018.

Early life
Dingizian was born in Baghdad, Iraq to Armenian parents on 16 September 1962. Her grandmother was a survivor of the Armenian genocide and eventually moved to Iraq. Her family moved to Sweden in 1965 due to her father's career. She grew up in Malmö.

Political career
Esabelle Dingizian entered politics in the late 1990s. In 1998 she was elected a member of the Botkyrka Municipality council. She became a member of the Riksdag in 2006 as the representative of the Stockholm County Council constituency. Dingizian became a member of the Committee on Cultural Affairs. She also worked with the Committee on the Labour Market and the Committee on Education. In 2014, Dingizian was elected the Third Deputy Speaker of the Swedish Parliament.

Personal life
Besides Swedish, she speaks Armenian and Arabic.
Till March 2008 she was known as Esabelle Reshdouni.

Sources

External links
Esabelle Dingizian at the Riksdag website

Politicians from Baghdad
Members of the Riksdag from the Green Party
Living people
1962 births
Women members of the Riksdag
Swedish people of Armenian descent
Iraqi people of Armenian descent
Iraqi emigrants to Sweden
20th-century Swedish women politicians
20th-century Swedish politicians
21st-century Swedish women politicians